Tomohide is a masculine Japanese given name.

Possible writings
Tomohide can be written using different combinations of kanji characters. Some examples:

友英, "friend, hero"
友秀, "friend, excellence"
友栄, "friend, prosperity"
友日出, "friend, sunrise"
知英, "know,hero"
知秀, "know, excellence"
知栄, "know, prosperity"
知日出, "know, sunrise"
智英, "intellect, hero"
智秀, "intellect, excellence"
智栄, "intellect, prosperity"
智日出, "intellect, sunrise"
共英, "together, hero"
共秀, "together, excellence"
朋英, "companion, hero"
朋秀, "companion, excellence"
朝英, "morning/dynasty, hero"
朝秀, "morning/dynasty, excellence"
朝栄, "morning/dynasty, prosperity"

The name can also be written in hiragana ともひで or katakana トモヒデ.

Notable people with the name
, English-language scholar and politician
, Japanese footballer
, Japanese samurai
, Japanese basketball coach

Japanese masculine given names